Ade Ntima Kiaku, known as Ade Ntima, is a DR Congolese footballer who plays as a forward. She has been a member of the DR Congo women's national team.

Club career
Ntima has played for Marths and Expresso in Angola.

International career
Ntima capped for the DR Congo at senior level during the 2006 African Women's Championship.

See also
 List of Democratic Republic of the Congo women's international footballers

References

External links

Year of birth missing (living people)
Living people
Footballers from Kinshasa
Democratic Republic of the Congo women's footballers
Women's association football forwards
Democratic Republic of the Congo women's international footballers
Democratic Republic of the Congo expatriate footballers
Democratic Republic of the Congo expatriate sportspeople in Angola
Expatriate women's footballers in Angola
21st-century Democratic Republic of the Congo people